East San Gabriel is a census-designated place (CDP) in Los Angeles County, California, United States. The population was 14,874 at the 2010 census, up from 14,512 at the 2000 census.

Geography
East San Gabriel is located at  (34.119149, -118.082053).

Demographics

2010
At the 2010 census East San Gabriel had a population of 14,874. The racial makeup of East San Gabriel was 5,037 (33.9%) White (21.9% Non-Hispanic White), 243 (1.6%) African American, 58 (0.4%) Native American, 7,421 (49.9%) Asian, 3 (0.0%) Pacific Islander, 1,602 (10.8%) from other races, and 510 (3.4%) from two or more races. Hispanic or Latino of any race were 3,700 persons (24.9%).

The census reported that 14,868 people (100% of the population) lived in households, no one lived in non-institutionalized group quarters and 6 (0%) were institutionalized.

There were 5,134 households, 1,882 (36.7%) had children under the age of 18 living in them, 2,871 (55.9%) were opposite-sex married couples living together, 650 (12.7%) had a female householder with no husband present, 313 (6.1%) had a male householder with no wife present.  There were 177 (3.4%) unmarried opposite-sex partnerships, and 32 (0.6%) same-sex married couples or partnerships. 1,064 households (20.7%) were one person and 387 (7.5%) had someone living alone who was 65 or older. The average household size was 2.90.  There were 3,834 families (74.7% of households); the average family size was 3.35.

The age distribution was 3,255 people (21.9%) under the age of 18, 1,154 people (7.8%) aged 18 to 24, 4,139 people (27.8%) aged 25 to 44, 4,304 people (28.9%) aged 45 to 64, and 2,022 people (13.6%) who were 65 or older.  The median age was 40.2 years. For every 100 females, there were 94.0 males.  For every 100 females age 18 and over, there were 90.3 males.

There were 5,365 housing units at an average density of 3,406.5 per square mile, of the occupied units 2,939 (57.2%) were owner-occupied and 2,195 (42.8%) were rented. The homeowner vacancy rate was 1.0%; the rental vacancy rate was 5.8%.  8,913 people (59.9% of the population) lived in owner-occupied housing units and 5,955 people (40.0%) lived in rental housing units.

According to the 2010 United States Census, East San Gabriel had a median household income of $69,946, with 7.9% of the population living below the federal poverty line.

2000
At the 2000 census there were 14,512 people, 5,201 households, and 3,708 families living in the CDP. The population density was 9,337.5 inhabitants per square mile (3,614.9/km). The racial makeup of the CDP was 42.55% White, 1.85% Black or African American, 0.63% Native American, 40.47% Asian, 0.09% Pacific Islander, 10.12% from other races, and 4.28% from two or more races.  23.52% of the population were Hispanic or Latino of any race.
Of the 5,201 households 34.3% had children under the age of 18 living with them, 53.4% were married couples living together, 12.1% had a female householder with no husband present, and 28.7% were non-families. 22.7% of households were one person and 7.1% were one person aged 65 or older.  The average household size was 2.79 and the average family size was 3.28.

The age distribution was 23.7% under the age of 18, 8.8% from 18 to 24, 32.0% from 25 to 44, 23.4% from 45 to 64, and 12.1% 65 or older.  The median age was 36 years. For every 100 females, there were 94.6 males.  For every 100 females age 18 and over, there were 92.3 males.

The median household income was $51,301 and the median family income  was $59,127. Males had a median income of $42,491 versus $32,479 for females. The per capita income for the CDP was $23,571.  About 9.1% of families and 10.5% of the population were below the poverty line, including 14.5% of those under age 18 and 6.3% of those age 65 or over.

Government

See also

San Gabriel, California

References

Census-designated places in Los Angeles County, California
San Gabriel, California
Census-designated places in California